Jerry Kirt Crump (February 18, 1933 – January 10, 1977) was a soldier in the United States Army during the Korean War. He received the Medal of Honor for his actions on September 6 and 7, 1951. Crump was killed in a car accident in 1977.

Awards and decorations

Medal of Honor citation
Rank and organization: Corporal, U.S. Army, Company L, 7th Infantry Regiment, 3rd Infantry Division

Place and date: Near Chorwon, Korea, 6 and September 7, 1951

Entered service at: Forest City, N.C. Born: February 18, 1933, Charlotte, N.C. 

G.O. No.: 68, July 11, 1952

Citation:

Cpl. Crump, a member of Company L, distinguished himself by conspicuous gallantry and outstanding courage above and beyond the call of duty in action against the enemy. During the night a numerically superior hostile force launched an assault against his platoon on Hill 284, overrunning friendly positions and swarming into the sector. Cpl. Crump repeatedly exposed himself to deliver effective fire into the ranks of the assailants, inflicting numerous casualties. Observing 2 enemy soldiers endeavoring to capture a friendly machine gun, he charged and killed both with his bayonet, regaining control of the weapon. Returning to his position, now occupied by 4 of his wounded comrades, he continued his accurate fire into enemy troops surrounding his emplacement. When a hostile soldier hurled a grenade into the position, Cpl. Crump immediately flung himself over the missile, absorbing the blast with his body and saving his comrades from death or serious injury. His aggressive actions had so inspired his comrades that a spirited counterattack drove the enemy from the perimeter. Cpl. Crump's heroic devotion to duty, indomitable fighting spirit, and willingness to sacrifice himself to save his comrades reflect the highest credit upon himself, the infantry and the U.S. Army.

Legacy
Cornelius Veteran's Monument in Cornelius, North Carolina features a bronze portrait statue of Cpl. Jerry K. Crump, dedicated on July 4, 2017.

See also
List of Medal of Honor recipients
List of Korean War Medal of Honor recipients

Notes

References

1933 births
1977 deaths
United States Army personnel of the Korean War
Korean War recipients of the Medal of Honor
United States Army Medal of Honor recipients
United States Army soldiers